The tenth season of the Romanian reality talent show Vocea României premiered on ProTV on September 9, 2022. Irina Rimes and Tudor Chirilă returned as coaches, while Denis 'The Motans' replaced Horia Brenciu. Smiley was joined by Theo Rose, for the first time in the history of the contest there being a double-coached team. Meanwhile, Pavel Bartoș returned for his tenth season as host. Iulia Pârlea acted as the green room host during the live shows.

The season finale aired on December 23, 2022. Iulian Nunucă, mentored by Tudor Chirilă, was declared winner of the season. It was Tudor's fifth victory as a coach.

Auditions 

The open call auditions were held in the following locations:

Teams
 Color key

Blind Auditions 
The show began with the Blind Auditions on September 9, 2022. In each audition, an artist sings their piece in front of the coaches whose chairs are facing the audience. If a coach is interested to work with the artist, they will press their button to face the artist. If a singular coach presses the button, the artist automatically becomes part of their team. If multiple coaches turn, they will compete for the artist, who will decide which team they will join. Each coach has one "block" to prevent another coach from getting an artist. This season, the coaches complete their teams  without a specific number of members. However, each one will be cut down to 14 contestants, on the last episode of the blinds.

Color key

Episode 1 (September 9) 
The first episode aired on September 9, 2022. The coaches performed "Imagine" at the start of the show.

Episode 2 (September 16) 
The second episode aired on September 16, 2022.

Episode 3 (September 23) 
The third episode aired on September 23, 2022.

Episode 4 (September 30) 
The fourth episode aired on September 30, 2022.

Episode 5 (October 7) 
The fifth episode aired on October 7, 2022.

Episode 6 (October 14) 
The sixth episode aired on October 14, 2022.

Episode 7 (October 21) 
The seventh episode aired on October 21, 2022.

Episode 8 (October 28) 
The eighth episode aired on October 28, 2022.

Episode 9 (November 4) 
The ninth episode aired on November 4, 2022.

The Battles 

For this season, the battles aired after the blind auditions. Coaches are allowed to steal two artists from other teams. Artist who won their battle or stolen by their coach will advance to the knockouts.

Color key:

Episode 10 (November 11) 
The tenth episode aired on November 11, 2022.

Episode 11 (November 18) 
The eleventh episode aired on November 18, 2022.

Episode 12 (November 25) 
The twelfth episode aired on November 25, 2022.

Knockout rounds 
The remaining nine artists from each team were split up into three groups of three. At the end of each knockout round the coach then decided out of the three artists one of them who won, and therefore made up their three artists to take to the live shows.

Colour key:

Episode 13 (December 2) 
The thirteenth episode aired on December 2, 2022.

Live shows 
Color key:

Week 1 - Top 12 (December 9) 
All twelve remaining contestants performed one song each in the live show on Friday, December 9, 2022. The public vote could save two contestants from each team, the third one was eliminated.

Week 2 - Semifinal (December 16) 
All eight remaining contestants performed two songs each in the semi-final on Friday, December 16, 2022: one solo song and a trio with the coach and the other teammate. The public vote could save one contestant from each team, the second one was eliminated.

Week 3 - Final (December 23) 
The top 4 contestants performed in the grand final on Friday, December 23, 2022. This week, the four finalists performed a solo song, a duet with a special guest and a duet with their coach. The public vote determined the winner, and that resulted in a victory for Iulian Nunucă, Tudor's fifth victory as a coach.

Elimination chart 
Color key
Artist info

Result details

Overall

Ratings

Notes

References 

2022 Romanian television seasons